Lee El (born Kim Ji-hyun on June 26, 1982) is a South Korean actress. She is best known for her supporting roles in the film Inside Men (2015), the television series It's Okay, That's Love, Guardian: The Lonely and Great God (2016–2017), A Korean Odyssey (2017-2018), and Black as well as her leading roles in the film What a Man Wants (2018) and television series My Liberation Notes (2022).

Filmography

Film

Television series

Web series

Theater

Awards and nominations

References

External links
 
 

1982 births
Living people
21st-century South Korean actresses
South Korean film actresses
South Korean television actresses
Actresses from Seoul
Sungkyunkwan University alumni